Eunemobius carolinus, the Carolina ground cricket, is a species of ground cricket in the family Trigonidiidae. It is found in North America.

Subspecies
These three subspecies belong to the species Eunemobius carolinus:
 Eunemobius carolinus brevicaudus (Bruner, 1904)
 Eunemobius carolinus carolinus (Scudder, 1877)
 Eunemobius carolinus mexicanus (Scudder, 1896)

References

Crickets
Articles created by Qbugbot
Insects described in 1877
Orthoptera of North America